Igor Sergeyevich Reshetnikov (born 22 May 1975) is a Russian professional football coach and a former player. He is an assistant coach for the Under-19 squad of FC Ural Yekaterinburg.

Club career
He made his debut in the Russian Premier League in 1996 for FC Uralmash Yekaterinburg.

External links
  Profile at Footballfacts

1975 births
People from Vyatskiye Polyany
Living people
Russian footballers
Association football defenders
FC Ural Yekaterinburg players
FC Metallurg Lipetsk players
Russian Premier League players
FC Sodovik Sterlitamak players
FC Dynamo Kirov players
Sportspeople from Kirov Oblast